Werner Leibbrand (1896–1974) was a German psychiatrist and medical historian. He showed an early talent and affection for music and languages. As a young man he considered a career as a pianist and he spoke French, Italian, Spanish, Russian and Yiddish. His father however, influenced him to study medicine and philosophy. After becoming a medical doctor he specialized in psychiatry. In the crisis years around 1930 he joined Verein Sozialistischer Ärzte (The Association of Socialist Doctors) and co-founded a center for drug addicts. He fell into disgrace and was persecuted by the Nazis.

After World War II he became director of the psychiatric clinic in Erlangen. In 1947 Leibbrand was appointed to a tenured professorship in the history of medicine at the University of Erlangen. He moved to Ludwig Maximilian University of Munich and was in 1958 appointed regular associate professor there, in 1969 professor emeritus. Between 1955 and 1973 he and Annemarie Wettley regularly taught at the Sorbonne in Paris.

He married three times: first to a singer, whom he divorced in 1932; he then married Margarete Bergius (1885–1949); and in 1962 he married Annemarie Wettley (Annemarie Leibbrand-Wettley) (1913–1996) with whom he co-authored several major works.

Major works

Awards
 Palmes Académiques, the highest academic award of the French Republic in 1971

Sources

 

 

 

 

 

 

1896 births
1974 deaths
Academic staff of the University of Erlangen-Nuremberg
Academic staff of the Ludwig Maximilian University of Munich
Academic staff of the University of Paris
German male non-fiction writers